
Gmina Wojnicz is an urban-rural gmina (administrative district) in Tarnów County, Lesser Poland Voivodeship, in southern Poland.

Villages
Apart from the town of Wojnicz, Gmina Wojnicz contains the villages and settlements of Biadoliny Radłowskie, Dębina Łętowska, Dębina Zakrzowska, Grabno, Isep, Łopoń, Łukanowice, Milówka, Olszyny, Rudka, Sukmanie, Więckowice, Wielka Wieś and Zakrzów.

Neighbouring gminas
Gmina Wojnicz is bordered by the gminas of Borzęcin, Dębno, Pleśna, Tarnów, Wierzchosławice, Wietrzychowice and Zakliczyn.

References
Polish official population figures 2006

Wojnicz
Tarnów County